is a Japanese actress and model who is affiliated with Stardust Promotion.

Biography
Morikawa was born in Aichi Prefecture in 1995. She has five family members and was the only daughter, and has two brothers.

In 2010, Morikawa won the Seventeen's Miss Seventeen, with models such as Ayaka Miyoshi, among the 5,575 applicants. In the same year on August 18, Tokyo Ryōgoku Kokugikan readers were invited to the event, Seventeen Summer School Festival were unveiled to the readers.

On February 28, 2015, in an April 2015 issue of Seventeen, she was graduated from the exclusive model from the magazine.

Filmography

TV series

Films

References

External links
 Official profile at Stardust Promotion 

21st-century Japanese actresses
Japanese female models
1995 births
Living people
Actors from Aichi Prefecture
Stardust Promotion artists
Models from Aichi Prefecture